The Sagisag ng Ulirang Kawal is a military decoration of the Armed Forces of the Philippines.  It is awarded to the personnel of the Armed Forces of the Philippines for conspicuous performance of non-military activities and community development programs or other related activities, which merit recognition.

See also
 Awards and decorations of the Armed Forces of the Philippines

References

Military awards and decorations of the Philippines